Syrian-Lebanese Women's Union (al-Ittihad al-Nisa'i al-Suri al-Lubnani), was a women's organization in Lebanon and Syria, founded in the 1920s and active until 1946. It has also been called Lebanese Women’s Union, Syrian Arab Women's Union and Arab Women’s Union. It has been referred to as the starting point of the active women's movement in Lebanon and Syria.

History
In 1920–21, several Lebanese women's groups formed an informal Union, which was formally established in 1924. It was founded by a group of several pioneering feminists: among them Nour Hamada, Adila Bayhum and Nazik al-Abid. It was established under the leadership of Labibah Thabit. 

The purpose of the Union was to function as an Umbrella organisation, uniting the women's groups of Lebanon and Syria. It was known as Arab (Lebanese) Women’s Union in Lebanon, and as Syrian Arab Women's Union in Syria. Most of the groups and individuals united under this organisation, were either leftists or secular nationalists.

The Union was a political organisation and hosted conferences and gave speeches and lectures on women's rights. It hosted the First Eastern Women's Congress in 1930.

In 1946, the Union was split in the Women’s Union under Ibtihaj Qaddoura and the Lebanese Women Solidarity Association under Laure Thabet. In 1952, the  Women’s Union and the Lebanese Women Solidarity Association were united to form the Lebanese Council for Women, also known as the Lebanese Women's Council.

See also
 General Union of Syrian Women

References

 Pernille Arenfeldt, Nawar Al-Hassan Golley, Mapping Arab Women's Movements: A Century of Transformations from Within
 https://civilsociety-centre.org/content/women%E2%80%99s-union-lebanon-and-syria
 James A. Reilly, Fragile Nation, Shattered Land: The Modern History of Syria
 Elizabeth Thompson, Colonial Citizens: Republican Rights, Paternal Privilege, and Gender in 

1920s establishments in Lebanon
Organizations established in the 1920s
Social history of Lebanon
Women's rights in Lebanon
1924 establishments in Mandatory Syria
Feminist organizations in Syria
Social history of Syria
Women's rights in Syria
Women's organisations based in Lebanon